Søren Hermansen (born 7 September 1970) is a Danish professional football coach and former player who played as a forward. He is manager of the Denmark national under-16 team.

Playing career
During his active career, he started as a youth player for hometown clubs Skovbakken and AGF before helping Aarhus Fremad reach promotion to the Danish Superliga. In 1998, he signed with Lyngby Boldklub before moving to Mechelen in Belgium. After three tumultuous seasons there where he was demoted to the reserves and did not receive months worth of pay, he ended his career in Iceland with Þróttur where he played for two years. He scored 75 goals in all Danish divisions during his tenures for Fremad and Lyngby.

Coaching career
After his active playing career, Hermansen started coaching local Copenhagen-clubs Vanløse and Skovlunde, before becoming a renowned youth manager, having coached Lyngby U17 as well as various national youth teams.

References

External links
Søren Hermansen at DBU

1970 births
Living people
Footballers from Aarhus
Danish men's footballers
Association football forwards
Aarhus Fremad players
Lyngby Boldklub players
K.V. Mechelen players
Soren Hermansen
Danish Superliga players
Danish 1st Division players
Danish 2nd Division players
Danish football managers
Lyngby Boldklub managers
VSK Aarhus players
Danish expatriate men's footballers
Expatriate footballers in Belgium
Expatriate footballers in Iceland
Danish expatriate sportspeople in Belgium
Danish expatriate sportspeople in Iceland
Skovlunde IF managers
Ballerup-Skovlunde Fodbold managers